Hernando is the fifth studio album by American band North Mississippi Allstars. It was released on January 22, 2008 through Songs of the South Records. Recording sessions took place at Zebra Ranch Studio in Coldwater, Mississippi. Production was handled by Jim Dickinson. It features contributions from Jimbo Mathus, Jimmy Davis, East Memphis Slim, Kurt "KC" Clayton and Amy LaVere. The band briefly toured the album across America in 2008.

The album peaked at number 142 on the US Billboard 200, number one on the Top Blues Albums chart, number 19 on the Independent Albums, number three on the Heatseekers Albums and number 12 on the Tastemakers.

Track listing

Personnel
Cody Dickinson – drums, electric washboard (track 4), guitar (track 6), vocals
Luther Dickinson – guitar, vocals
Chris Crew – bass, vocals
James "Jimbo Mathus" Mathis Jr. – vocals (tracks: 1, 7, 8)
Jimmy Davis – vocals (track 7)
Jim "East Memphis Slim" Dickinson – piano (tracks: 5, 7, 11), producer
Kurt "KC" Clayton – piano (track 6)
Amy LaVere – upright bass (track 7)
Kevin Houston – recording, mixing
Brad Blackwood – mastering

Charts

References

External links

2008 albums
Albums produced by Jim Dickinson
North Mississippi Allstars albums